Designs of level crossings, where railway lines cross roads or other paths, vary country-to-country.

Europe 

There were 108,196 level crossings in the European Union Member States in 2014. On average there are just under 0.5 level crossings per line-kilometres in the EU.

53% of all those level crossings are active level where users are protected from or warned of the approaching train by devices activated when it is unsafe for the user to traverse the crossing.
The remaining 47% of level crossings are unprotected. 28% of railway fatalities are from level crossing related incidents.

Austria

Austrian level crossings are similar to German crossings, in that they have either a single or double light, not always with automatic barriers that lower when a train approaches. The crossings with two lights (one amber, one red) are the more modern, replacing old single red light crossings.

Belgium
Automatic level crossings in Belgium have two red lights, a "moon-white" light, electronic (previously mechanical) bells and (usually) barriers. The white light flashes for half a second at regular intervals to inform drivers and pedestrians that they can cross the level crossing, and that the signal is in working order. In some cases the white light is absent; in that case overtaking on the crossing is not allowed. The bells ring until the barriers are fully lowered and then stop. If barriers are absent the bell continues ringing throughout. They are also in use with two or three lights and without barriers on tramways at De Panne(until 2021), Zwijndrecht, Anderlues, Ghent, and MIVB Line 44 (only here with bells).

At a level crossing, any overhead electric power cables must also cross. This led to a conflict where a mainline railway that crossed one of the country's once extensive interurban tram lines (vicinal, buurtspoorweg/vicinaux) was electrified. In at least one location, this led to the tram overhead being dismantled.

Bosnia and Herzegovina
Bosnia and Herzegovina level crossings uses two red lights in a triangle, much like the crossings in Serbia, Switzerland and Croatia. Crossings without lights or gates uses white target boards.

Croatia
Croatian level crossings are similar to Slovenian and Bosnian crossings in that the lights are composed of red lights in a triangle. Many crossings are automatic with barriers and bells.

Czech Republic and Slovakia

Level crossings in Czech Republic and Slovakia use a sign on the lights that reads "" (Attentiontrain) to warn people of the crossing. The crossbuck of a Slovak crossing is on a standard sign, while the Czech crossbuck is a cutout sign. The lights are similar to the Belgian crossings in that they have two red lights and sometimes a white light, which means the driver can go up to 50 km/h, rather than 30 km/h, with half barriers. On some crossings, the space for a white light is provided but no light is there, because in newer legislation it is taken as dangerous element that should not be used to positively change drivers' speed. Sometimes a yellow outline surrounds the crossbucks for increased visibility at night. Some of the oldest crossings do not feature lights but do have bells and gates. Some older (though newer than those mentioned, dubbed SSSRs) crossings are in a design similar to American or UK crossings, and feature electromechanical buzzers as opposed to bells. Newer crossings are similar to those of the UK.

More recently, Slovak legislation has called for the phase-out of the Czech crossing in favor of German counterparts. The newest crossings already feature German bells, lights (though they are in the Czech style as opposed to German) and gates, where they are needed.

Denmark

The crossings in Denmark have white and red saltires and crossing lights in the shape of a triangle coloured red, white and blue with a flashing red light in the centre. Most crossings are only half barrier, and bells stop sounding when gates have lowered on almost all crossings. If the crossing has no gates, the bells sound until the train has passed. Unprotected crossings have only saltires and sometimes a sign saying "" ("Look for train"). Some older guarded crossings do not have the saltires.

Estonia

Most protected crossings are equipped with LED-lights. Non-gated crossings have a crossbuck fitted, but gated ones do not. All gated crossings have half-barriers though some are marginally longer than others. Alarms may vary. Many crossings use the same alarm sound used on Polish crossings, very rarely fire alarms, sometimes a simple high pitch beep. Some non-gated crossings have a white flashing light that flashes when the crossing is inactive. In less populated areas crossings are fitted with just a crossbuck and sometimes a stop sign. A few USSR era signals still remain, however due to their obsolescence they are being replaced.

Finland

In Finland, level crossings with warning lights have the more common red  and a white light that flashes except when the red  flash. Most, but not all, crossings with lights also have barriers. Full-length barriers are usually used only for pedestrian and bicycle lanes. Half-length barriers are used for motor roads, to avoid the risk of a vehicle being trapped on the tracks between the barriers. Bells begin to ring when the red lights start flashing and usually stop when the barriers have come down. Red-and-yellow crossbucks are used on both controlled and Sweden style crossing uncontrolled level crossings. If there are two or more tracks, the lower part of the cross is doubled. Only minor agricultural crossings may have no signs at all. On bigger roads there are usually also approach signs. Finnish level crossings are the sixth safest in Europe. Finland's state railway system has almost 3000 level crossings, according to TraFi. In Finland over the course of railway history many level crossing accidents have occurred, in comparison to Scandinavian countries. In Finland the maximum speed for trains on the rails with level crossings is 140 km/h.

France

French level crossings usually have automatic half barriers, a single red light on a circle backboard, and bells (11,200 out of 15,300). When the crossing activates, the red light flashes, the bells ring, and the barriers come down. Due to a crash at Allinges in 2008, the law since 2017 allows adding an extra blinking red light when the first red light might not be visible. French level crossings with more than one track have a sign saying "" (a train can hide another train).

Of these, less than 0.4% are on national roads, 31.4% are on departmental roads and 68.2% are on town roads. The high-speed train lines are built with no level crossings, but high-speed trains are also used on conventional railway lines and exposed there to level crossing accidents.

100 crashes occurred at French level crossings in 2015, causing 26 fatalities. Most of these crashes are caused by misuse, e.g., trying to pass as the barriers are down or are closing, in violation of the French traffic code.

Germany

German crossings use a white cross with red tips as a traffic signal for level crossings. On small branch lines, these can be the only indicator, and are then equivalent to a stop sign. More often they are supplemented by either yellow-and-red-only traffic lights, or a flashing red light on a square backboard with a red and white border that indicates an arriving train, usually in combination with a bell as acoustic warning. Additional indicators like a light signalling "" ("2 trains") are rare.

Greece

Greek crossings use a yellow cross with red tips as a crossbuck. Gated crossings tend to follow United States practices and use American-made crossing warning equipment.

Norway
In Norway, level crossings have red and white crosses with a similar light system to German crossings, although the yellow light shines and then the single red light flashes, as do the lights on the barriers.

From 1998 to 2008 the Norwegian National Rail Administration removed about 1000 level crossings, leaving about 3500 still in use.  is the maximum speed for trains over level crossings. In addition, Oslo's and Bergen's tram or light rail systems have some level crossings. Most lines on the Oslo Metro are free of them. Most of the level crossings were removed from the old suburban railways in the western parts of the city, when the lines were upgraded to metro standard, but some crossings are retained on the Holmenkollen Line.

Russia
Like U.S. level crossings, Russian crossings have two red lights. They act similarly to U.S. level crossings, but the barriers go slightly up for one second before going down.

Every level crossing with barriers is manned by a crossing keeper, who depending on the crossing type, may operate it, or if it is automatic, ensure its correct operation.

Some Russian crossings have flip-up barriers that allow cars to drive over them when going away from the tracks, but physically prevent cars from driving around or through a lowered gate toward the tracks.

Sweden
In Sweden there are 8,500 level crossings, according to Trafikverket, the Swedish Transport Administration (formerly Banverket, Swedish Rail Administration). On public roads they have light signals with or without gates. On private roads there are level crossings without signals. Most accidents occur on crossings without gates. For many years there have been activities to reduce the number of accidents, usually by adding gates, or adding light signals if there were none. On the main lines many bridges have been built, and also anywhere a new road or new railway has been built. Still there are some level crossings left on the main lines. A train speed of 200 km/h is allowed in Sweden over level crossings, if there are gates and an obstacle detection unit. This unit detects cars on the track and prevents the gates from closing fully and stops the train. According to Trafikverket, in 15 years there has only been one serious collision between a car and a train on such a level crossing, when a car ran through the gates just in front of the train. Level crossings on electrified lines have a wide sign above the roadway at the barrier line saying "" (dangerous conduit). Some also have a sign saying "" (beware of trains).

United Kingdom

Level crossings in the United Kingdom started out as crossings with gates opened manually by a signalman. These were standard all across the network until mechanised barriers started to be introduced. These were either automatic or operated by a signalman adjacent to the crossing. After the major Hixon rail crash in 1968, the design of level crossings started to change, and all mechanised crossings had to have a preliminary amber light fitted. The UK is one of only a few countries with this design of crossing. More recent advances in technology have led to more technical automatic crossings, safer open crossings, and crossings with obstacle detection systems to detect stray people or vehicles on the crossing. 
In 2020 there were around 5800 level crossings on the mainline railway system, and a further 1500 on heritage and minor railway lines. The number on the mainlines is being slowly reduced as diversions and bridges are implemented.  
Most UK level crossings are footpath and user-worked crossings, and 1 in 5 are on public highways. The majority of these are manually controlled and monitored from either the adjacent signal-box or another box using CCTV.

There are many different types of crossings. Crossings which are automatic and independent from the signalling system (like most standard crossings internationally) have half-barriers.
Level crossings were the location of 54 collisions between trains and road vehicles between 2011 and 2018.

The nearly 7,500 level crossings in the United Kingdom can be broadly classified into two types: 

protected crossings, with warning lights and gates or barriers which prevent crossing when a train is nearby;
unprotected crossings: footpaths, bridleways and user-worked crossings (where the responsibility for ensuring a safe crossing lies on the user).

Network Rail, responsible for maintaining most of the crossings, is taking steps to reduce safety risks, for example by closing crossings where possible. There are still old wooden manual gates in use at regular and Heritage railways.

Africa

Botswana
Crossing signals in Botswana, like Israel, are American made. The crossbucks used are identical to the those used in Latvia, Czech and neighbors.

South Africa
South African railway crossings consist of two flashing lights.

North America

Canada 

Public railway crossings in Canada are required by law to be marked by a crossbuck, along with alternating flashing red lights and gate arms on high-traffic roads. Crossbuck signs are white with a red outline and, if the situation warrants, contain a supplemental sign to indicate the number of tracks. Private roads in Canada that cross tracks are marked with either a crossbuck or a stop sign. A large number of public Canadian Pacific Railway level crossings in Ontario do not have a crossing arm but still utilize the crossbuck and alternating flashing lights. The advance-warning sign is a yellow diamond shape with a diagram of a track crossing a straight segment of road (similar to a crossroads sign, except that the horizontal road is replaced by a track). Before changes in regulations mandated bilingual (English and French) or wordless signs, either "railway crossing" or "" was written on each crossbuck. Lights, gates, and bells are identical to their American counterparts.

There are 22,884 public railroad crossings in Canada in 2018, according to the UNECE.

Mexico
Mexico has begun to install US-style crossing signals on some of its KCS de México, Ferromex, and Ferrosur rail lines; however, the majority of railroad crossings in Mexico remain unsignalled, marked only with a crossbuck. The crossing devices are very similar to the US models, sporting larger lights. The crossbucks read "", "", or "". The majority of crossings are solar-operated, and the lights flash faster than the US signals. Unfortunately, these devices are easy targets for vandals which steal their components such as gate motors and solar panels. In many cases the gates do not lower due to vandalism or lack of maintenance. In some cases, due to the lack of maintenance, the lights do not turn on at all. The rail companies, which by law are required to maintain the crossing signals, take little to no action in maintaining these devices, and the majority remain unmaintained, posing a threat to drivers.

United States

The first US patent for manual/electrical crossing gates was awarded on 27 August 1867, to J. Nason and J. F. Wilson, both of Boston.

There are 209,765 level crossings in the US in 2018, according to the UNECE.

Crossing identification
Every crossing, whether above grade, below grade, or at grade, is required to be assigned a unique identifier which is a six-digit number with a trailing letter used as a checksum. This identifier is called a Grade Crossing Number, and is usually posted with a sign or sticker on the sign or equipment. This allows the exact location of a crossing anywhere in the United States to be identified in the event of an incident involving that crossing.

Traffic control devices
All public crossings in the United States are required to be marked by at least a crossbuck. The 2009 Manual on Uniform Traffic Control Devices requires passive crossings (crossings without actuated flashing lights or gates) to have either stop signs or yield signs in addition to the crossbuck, unless a flagger will stop traffic every time a train approaches. Normally a yield sign is used, unless it is determined that all vehicles should stop at the crossing, such as a location with poor sight distance. All passive crossings must be upgraded to meet this standard by 31 December 2019.

If two or more tracks are found at a crossing, a sign denoting the number of tracks is required. This sign is optional at crossings with a gate.

As traffic on the road crossing or the rail crossing increases, safety features are increased accordingly. More heavily trafficked crossings have "automatic warning devices" (AWDs), with alternately flashing red lights to warn automobile drivers and a bell to warn pedestrians. Additional safety is attained through crossing gates that block automobiles' approach to the tracks when activated. Increasingly, crossings are being fitted with four-quadrant gates to prevent circumventing the gates.

Operation of a typical AWD-equipped railroad crossing in the United States is as follows:

 About 30 seconds before arriving at the crossing, the train trips a track circuit near the crossing, triggering the crossing signals. The lights begin to flash alternately, and a bell (or bells) mounted at the crossing begins ringing. After several seconds of flashing lights and ringing bells, the crossing gates (if equipped) begin to lower, which usually takes 5–10 seconds. Some AWDs silence the bell once the gates are fully lowered (typically seen on most Norfolk Southern and CSX crossings); most continue ringing the bells throughout (Union Pacific, BNSF Railway). Some crossings will not sound the bell at all after dark in the case that it is installed near a residential area. The lights continue to flash throughout regardless.
About 15–20 seconds before arriving at the crossing, the train begins ringing its bell and sounding its horn in accordance with NORAC rule 14L or GCOR rule 5.8.2(7): two longs, one short, and one long. These are prolonged or repeated until the train's locomotive (or cab, if a commuter train) occupies the crossing. If the AWD is equipped with a wayside horn in accordance with FRA Quiet Zone rules, the AWD may provide the whistle signal instead of the train; however, the train is required to ring its bell regardless.
After the train has cleared the crossing, the bells (if silenced) may begin ringing again (such as the Florida East Coast Railway), and the gates (if equipped) begin to rise. Once the gates have completely risen back to their fully raised position, all warning signals, including the lights and bells, are suppressed.

Some AWD track circuits are equipped with motion detectors that deactivate the crossing signal if the train stops or slows significantly before arriving at the crossing.

As indicated above, the bell sequence at each individual crossing can be different. (These bells should not be confused with the bells that are mounted on the trains.) Generally, the bells follow one of these patterns:

The bell begins ringing when the lights begin flashing and stops when the gates have completely lowered.
The bell begins ringing when the lights begin flashing and continues until the gates have gone all the way up after the train passes.
The bell begins ringing when the lights begin flashing and stops when the gates have completely lowered, and then resumes ringing when the gates begin to go up, until the gates have returned to their original position.
The bell begins ringing when the lights begin flashing and continues until the train touches the crossing, then resumes two seconds after the train has passed; this pattern is used exclusively on the BNSF Chicago Subdivision (commonly referred to as the "Racetrack"). 
The final, and most common practice is for the bell to begin ringing when the lights begin flashing and stops when the gates begin to go up following the passing of the train.

Some level crossings that are located close to intersections with traffic lights program the signals with a preemption sequence so when the approaching train trips the track circuit, it not only activates the crossing signals, but also changes the traffic lights facing the crossing to green, to clear any traffic that may be queued on the crossing. If the intersection's stop line is right before the tracks (typically sharing the crossing's stop line), the track circuits change the traffic lights to red (often without a yellow phase). Some track circuits place the signals into flash mode the entire time the AWDs are active. In cases where railroads share the right of way with vehicular traffic, simple railroad preemption may cause an all-red flash in traffic lights.

A few level crossings still use wigwag signals, which were developed in the early 1900s by the Pacific Electric Railway interurban system in the Los Angeles region to protect its many level crossings. Though now considered to be antiques, in 2020 there were 33 wigwags active, almost all on branch lines. By law, these signals must be replaced by the now-standard alternating red lights when they are retired.. Some remain on heritage lines and in amusement parks. 

Crossings are permitted up to  only if an "impenetrable barrier" is in place to block traffic when a train approaches.

Here, due to the high speed of the trains, gates that totally prevent road traffic from reaching the tracks are mandatory on all level crossings. Steel mesh nets were tested on some crossings to further prevent collisions, but these were removed because of maintenance issues in 2001.

A device called StopGate was installed at five locations —  This system resembles a fortified version of a standard crossing gate, with two larger arms blocking the entire width of the roadway and locking into a securing device on the side of the road opposite the gate pivot mechanism. The gate arms are reinforced with high-strength steel cable, which helps the gate absorb the impact of a vehicle crashing into the gate. The manufacturer claims that the StopGate can stop a  truck within . The system worked as intended at the Madison crossing, when the system stopped a truck while a Wisconsin and Southern Railroad train was in the crossing. This experiment ended due to many defects. They are now normal level crossings again, except for the Alabama crossing.

Another new type of barrier was tested in Michigan and was hoped to reduce drivers attempting to drive around lowered crossing gates. The devices are called delineators, consisting of a series of flexible bollards that rise vertically out of vertical tubes in the pavement when the crossing signal is activated. The delineators are designed so that they will not be broken and will not damage vehicles if they are hit, allowing vehicles to exit the level crossing if they are already within it when the gates are activated. The test period for the new barrier began on 5 December 2007, and ran for at least 17 months.

Locomotive equipment
In the United States and in countries following United States practices, a locomotive must have a bright headlight and ditch lights (two lights located below the headlight but above the pilot), a working bell, and a whistle or horn that must be sounded four times (long-long-short-long), similar to the signal for the International Morse Code letter "Q", as the train approaches the crossing. Oscillating lights such as Mars Lights as well as strobe beacons have also been used in the past to increase train visibility at level crossings, but both have mostly been replaced by the simpler ditch lights.

Quiet zones
In the interest of noise abatement, some U.S. cities have passed laws prohibiting the sounding of bells and whistles. In December 2003, the Federal Railroad Administration published regulations that would create areas where train horns could be silenced, provided that certain safety measures were put in place, such as concrete barriers preventing drivers from circumventing the gates or automatic whistles (also called wayside horns) mounted at the crossing. Trains would still sound their horns upon spotting a hazard, such as a pedestrian crossing in the path of the train. Implementation of the new "Quiet Zone" Final Rule was delayed repeatedly, but was finally implemented in the summer of 2005. Rail "Quiet Zone" crossings still require bells as part of the AWDs, in addition to the wayside horns.

A Partial Quiet Zone is a rail segment on which Quiet Zone rules are in effect from 10 p.m. to 7:00 a.m. but train horns sound routinely during the day.

Asia

China
Chinese crossings have two red lights and at most crossings, a white light that remains lit when the crossing is clear. Level crossings in China use alarms rather than bells.

Speed up campaigns have largely eliminated many crossings on heavily used trunk main lines though some still do exist. Most at-grade crossings in China are for smaller industrial spur and access lines which may or may not have crossing gates.

Hong Kong
Most of Hong Kong's railway network is either underground or on elevated viaducts, meaning that level crossings are rare. However, level crossings continue to exist on the MTR Light Rail network, and one such level crossing was the site of a level crossing accident in 1994.

India 

A majority of the level crossings in India are manually operated. Signals and barriers are installed at all crossings while manual crossings are additionally required to have the hand red and green signal lamps. Indian Railways aims at elimination of all unmanned crossings and replacing them with manned crossings.

Indonesia

Most level crossings in Indonesia have sirens. They also have two red lights (usually) and full barriers in red and white. Level crossings in Indonesia are not all officially operated by the Kereta Api Indonesia railway company; some crossings (usually in rural or village areas) are guarded by civilian volunteers, and are not usually guarded 24 hours. Crossings in cities and urban areas are fully operated by the railway company. Usually each level crossing has a small guard room to control the traffic and barriers at the crossing. Official crossings are marked by sirens and red-white (Indonesian flag–like) barriers.

Level crossings in Indonesia tend to be congested by traffic, thus they are not automatic like in Western countries, so level crossing watchmen are usually posted at every crossing; these are employees from the railway company. However, Indonesia plans to replace these crossings with automated crossings or overpasses in the aftermath of the 2013 Bintaro crash. The Ministry of Transportation bought 11 automated crossing barriers in 2015. 
 
At Yogyakarta Station there are still "rolling gates" in use but only opened for bikes and pedestrians.

Prior to 2013, there were few major accidents in crossings. On 9 December 2013, a Kereta Commuter Indonesia commuter train hitted a Pertamina fuel truck stuck in Bintaro crossing (now replaced with a flyover), killing drivers and passengers in the front car. On 6 December 2015, a MetroMini bus was hit by a commuter train in front of Angke station, killing 18 bus passengers but not injuring the train passengers. On 6 April 2018, a Sancaka train bound for Surabaya hitted a container truck near , Ngawi, killing the train driver. On 26 July 2022, a Lokal Merak train bound for Rangkasbitung hitted an odong-odong in Serang, killing passengers and children in the front car.

Due to the high death toll of train-versus-car accidents and severe traffic-jam impact, both local and national governments have started to close level crossings, especially in Jakarta. Sometimes crossings are closed due to increase of headway, like the Jatinegara-Bekasi track revisions that left only three out of seven crossings open. Numerous underpasses and flyovers have been created, and later the nearby roads are closed; for example, the replacement of 2013 crash site in Bintaro, South Jakarta with a flyover. Crossings on national highways are in being closed permanently due to high traffic; for example, the Klonengan crossing in Brebes, located in the main access to Purwokerto city.

Israel
Israel generally follows United States practices, and much of the Israel Railways network employs American-made crossing warning equipment. The crossbucks used, however, are more similar to the Russian type.

In 2017, Israel Railways reported a 22% increase in the incidents of barrier smashing during the summer months.

Japan

According to the Ministry of Land, Infrastructure, Transport and Tourism, there are in total about 33,300  in Japan as of 2016. These are easily identifiable with their yellow and black crossbucks mounted adjacent to the crossing, and newer crossings are often paved in green asphalt for easy recognition. Most of these are protected with  usually equipped with alternating flashing red lights and yellow-and-black-striped barriers. Many signals are also equipped with signs with red LED arrows that indicate the direction of approaching trains.

Similarly to school buses in the United States, but unlike many other countries, all cars and bicycles must stop before proceeding over any level crossing in Japan, regardless of whether there are electronic signals, as required by the Road Traffic Act.

On some busy rail lines, especially in urban areas like in Tokyo, Osaka and Nagoya, so many trains pass through some level crossings that they are almost always closed to vehicular traffic. In some cases, such as the Chūō Main Line, more than 50 trains pass in an hour, which equates to only two minutes in which vehicles can cross the tracks during that interval, causing serious traffic congestion and inconvenience.

Taiwan
As most railways in Taiwan were built during Japanese administration, railway level crossings remain very common and generally built to the same design as Japan, though many urban crossings have been eliminated when the railroads have been moved underground, e.g. segments of the West Coast Line in Taipei City and Kaohsiung City, or moved elevated, or has converted to cubic crossing with road, or abolished, e.g. the former TRA Tamsui Line that is now the Taipei Metro Tamsui Line without any level crossings.

The Act Governing the Punishment of Violation of Road traffic Regulations (道路交通管理處罰條例) prescribes fines for drivers and pedestrians who commit certain classes of violations in regards to level crossings; these include disobeying flagmen, insisting to cross while a crossing's signals are active or when the gate is being lowered, crossing a passive crossing without stopping beforehand, and overtaking, making a U-turn, backing up, stopping or parking on a railway level crossing in a vehicle. Pedestrians can be fined 2,400 new Taiwan dollars for a violation, drivers of non-motorized vehicles such as bicycles can be fined between 1,200 and 2,400 dollars, and drivers of motor vehicles can be fined up to 15,000 to 90,000 new Taiwan dollars for a violation. If an accident occurs, the driver's license can also be revoked for a minimum of six years, and drivers can also face legal responsibility and compensation of damages.

Accidents at railway level crossings remain a very serious concern, such as when a truck entered a level crossing and collided with the Taroko Express in Jan 17, 2012. On average, there is a level crossing each . An emergency button is installed on every level crossing in the country, allowing members of the public to report emergencies at a crossing to authorities, such as stalled vehicles or other obstacles.

Thailand 
Thailand crossings have two flashing lights that slowly flash, and are also equipped with alarms. Each crossing that has gates has two yellow-orange strobe lights for better visibility when the gates are active. Most crossings have large flexible gates that fully block traffic from going around but other locations may use shorter gate arms. At many locations, the alarm continues to sound for the duration of the gates being closed but at other crossings, the alarm only sounds when the gates are closing and opening.

, the Thai rail network has 2,624 level crossings nationwide. Many have no crossing barriers, making them frequent sites of accidents. Some level crossings are manually operated, wherein the barriers are lowered using a manual switch when trains approach. There were/are still "roller-gates" in use, but these are increasingly being replaced by heavy barriers. Sometimes they are still available as a reserve. Previously there were also a system where a cable came down the road, with red and white signs on it.

Vietnam
All railroad crossing signs in Vietnam are based on the Russian Federation crossing signs with white crossbuck and red border (St. Andrew crossbuck), crossing each other at a 45-degree angle.

 Devices and signaling arranged at horizontal lines
 Guarded crossroads: barrier or shields, signal lights, electric bells, signboards, marker poles, fences, road markings on roads, railroad roadside signals (if any), and other signaling devices when permitted by competent authorities;
 Automatic warning crossings: signal lights, electric bells, signboards, marker posts or fences, with or without automatic barrier, road markings on road, and other signaling devices when possible authorized level;
 Roads across the crossing: signboards, marker posts or fences, road markings, and other signaling devices when so permitted by competent authorities.
 Signal and equipment systems arranged at crossroads to ensure traffic safety and prevent accidents. All organizations and individuals must be responsible for protecting, not arbitrarily moving, appropriating, damaging or reducing the effectiveness and effect of the systems.

In Vietnam, there are still "roller~barriers/gates" in use, either electric or manual.

An extremely long level crossing is in Ho Chi Minh City, near Gò Vấp station, crossing Phạm Văn Đồng Street. The track crosses about twelve carriageways. There are 8 barriers and 2 very long roller-barriers/gates that must be pushed into place.

Oceania

Australia

Australian railways generally follow United States practices, and they have increasingly been employing American-made crossing warning equipment, such as level crossing predictors, which are able to provide a consistent amount of warning time for trains of widely varying speeds. There are many different types of rail crossings in Australia; railways that run through rural areas often do not have barriers or even lights/bells to warn of incoming trains, while urban crossings will either have lights and bells or lights, bells, and boom gates.

In Melbourne, there are several level crossings where electrified train tracks cross roads with electrified tram tracks. These crossings are fitted with equipment to change the voltage supplied to the overhead wiring depending on the vehicle using the crossing, and trains are severely speed-limited across these intersections. Due partly to this complication, as well as deaths, accidents and traffic problems at level crossings, the Victorian Government under premier Daniel Andrews started the Level Crossing Removal Project in 2015 with the aim of removing 50 level crossings, which was later extended to 110. 

All cases where a train line crosses a road are classified as level crossings whether or not they are signed. A tram track in its own right-of-way crossing a road can also be classified as a level crossing if it is signed with a crossbuck reading either "tramway crossing" or "railway crossing". Otherwise, it is considered a regular intersection and usually has either traffic lights or a give-way sign facing the road (see Gallery).

Some innovations in Australia are crossbucks with a pair of flashing yellow lights at about  before the level crossing, called advance active warning signals (AAWS). This is done particularly where there are curves and other visibility problems on the road. AAWS are used where road speeds are high, and braking distances are extended, or where the level crossing is obscured by blind curves or sunlight. Another innovation is to transmit level crossing warning signals by radio into the cabin of nearby vehicles. This is useful at passive crossings, which are not fitted with flashing lights.

In areas subject to the Advanced Train Management System (ETMS), level crossings are controlled by satellite downlinks, and supervised by satellite uplinks. 

Australia also has about 4000 km of sugar-cane narrow-gauge railroads. Many level crossings on these lines are protected with the regular red railroad warning lights and crossbucks, often supplemented by a red flashing light on top of the pole. Level crossings with barriers are very rare.

New Zealand 
There were (in 2012) 1390 public road level crossings in New Zealand, of which 275 crossings are protected by flashing red lights, bells, and half-arm barriers; and 421 are protected by flashing red lights and bells only. The remainder are controlled by "Stop and Give Way" signs. Level crossings are the responsibility of rail infrastructure owner KiwiRail Network, the NZ Transport Agency, and if the crossing is on a local road, the local city or district council. Much like Australia, New Zealand employs American-made crossing warning equipment.

On the Taieri Gorge Railway in rural South Island, roads and railways share the same bridge when crossing a river, with the rail line in the road. Motorists, as well as giving way to oncoming traffic if required (the bridges have one lane) must ensure that the bridge is clear of a train, end to end, before starting to cross the bridge. For safety, trains are limited to  while crossing the bridges.

In many parts of New Zealand, railway lines run parallel to and close (within ) to roads. Many level crossing accidents have been caused by drivers turning right into side roads crossing the railway line concentrating on finding a suitable gap in oncoming traffic so that they fail to check the railway line or notice the activated level crossing alarms until it is too late to stop. An accident of this type occurred in August 1993 at Rolleston, near Christchurch, when a cement mixer truck turned right off State Highway 1 and collided with the side of a southbound Southerner passenger train, ripping open two carriages. The accident resulted in three deaths, including the sister of New Zealand international cricketer Chris Cairns.

In 2019, KiwiRail changed the rate of flashing lights at level crossings from 85 fpm (flashes per minute) to the standard laid down by the "American Railway Engineering and Maintenance-of-Way Association" of 50 fpm so that a new order for level crossing equipment did not have non-standard requirements.

Notes

References

Level crossings
Rail transport by country